Lea Castle is a ruined medieval castle near Portarlington, County Laois. A timber castle was built in the late 12th or early 13th century and replaced by a later stone castle. The remains of the castle mostly date to the 13th century and consist of a four-storey donjon and a gatehouse.

The castle was the property of the FitzGerald family, who held the title Earl of Kildare from 1316. The FitzGeralds in the 1290s clashed fiercely with the powerful Richard de Burgh, 2nd Earl of Ulster, and in 1294-5 they held him prisoner in Lea Castle for several months, until Parliament secured his release.

References

Bibliography

 

Castles in County Laois
Norman architecture in Ireland